Red Lips is a 1928 American silent drama film directed by Melville W. Brown and starring Marian Nixon, Charles "Buddy" Rogers and Stanley Taylor. It is based on the 1924 novel The Plastic Age by Percy Marks.

Cast
 Marian Nixon as Cynthia Day
 Charles "Buddy" Rogers as Hugh Carver / Buddy
 Stanley Taylor as Stewart Freeman / Carl Peters
 Hayden Stevenson as 'Pop' Moultin
 Andy Devine as A sophomore / Professor Fountain
 Robert Seiter as Roache
 Hugh Trevor as 'Spike' Blair / Norris Parker
 Earl McCarthy as An upper classmate

References

Bibliography
 Goble, Alan. The Complete Index to Literary Sources in Film. Walter de Gruyter, 1999.

External links
 

1928 films
1928 drama films
Silent American drama films
Films directed by Melville W. Brown
American silent feature films
1920s English-language films
Universal Pictures films
American black-and-white films
Films based on American novels
1920s American films